Henson Cargill (February 5, 1941 – March 24, 2007) was an American country music singer best known for the socially controversial 1968 Country No. 1 hit "Skip a Rope".  His music career began in Oklahoma in clubs around Oklahoma City and Tulsa.  He earned national recognition after getting a Nashville producer to agree to produce "Skip a Rope".

Cargill had a number of Top 20 hits including "Row Row Row" (1968), "None of My Business", and "The Most Uncomplicated Goodbye I Ever Heard" (1970). Later hits included "Some Old California Memory" and "Silence on the Line". He also had a television show and performed for many years in Reno and Las Vegas.

Early life
Cargill was born in Oklahoma City, United States. His family was active in politics and raised bison on a ranch outside Oklahoma City, where his grandfather, O. A. Cargill, served as mayor in the 1920s. Cargill graduated from Northwest Classen High School.  Marrying his high school sweetheart, Marta, he moved to Fort Collins, Colorado, in the early 1960s to study veterinary medicine at Colorado State University. Returning to Oklahoma City, he worked as a court clerk, private investigator, and deputy sheriff.

Music career
Cargill began his music career playing in clubs in and around Oklahoma City and Tulsa. While working the late shift as a deputy sheriff, Cargill received a visit from his friend and fellow musician Johnny Johnson, who told him of a seasoned and professional vocal group he had been recording with. Henson began recording locally at the Sully Studios with the Kimberleys as backup. They began to tour together all over the west.

In the mid 1960s, Henson went to Nashville and recorded "Skip A Rope". Henson released his album on the Monument Label in 1967 and immediately scored in a big way with this first release.  The song became a hit, spending five weeks at No. 1 on the country chart in 1968, and also making his only Top 25 appearance on the pop charts (making him a one-hit wonder in the pop music field). This success generated much media attention, and he was in demand on such TV programs as The Mike Douglas Show to The Tonight Show Starring Johnny Carson.

After "Skip a Rope", Cargill continued to have Top 20 hits with such songs as "Row Row Row" (1968), "None of My Business" (his only other Top 10) (1969), and "The Most Uncomplicated Goodbye I Ever Heard" (1970).  He hosted a television show, Country Hayride, beginning in 1962, and performed for many years in Reno and Las Vegas. Johnny Cash was godfather to his oldest son, Cash. After leaving Monument Records, Henson moved to Mega Records in 1971, where he scored several minor hits. In 1973, he made a strong comeback to the charts when he signed with Atlantic Records and scored two Top 30 hits in 1974 with "Some Old California Memory" and a version of Mac Davis' hit song "Stop and Smell the Roses". In 1980, he formed his own record label Copper Mountain Records and he scored his last Top 30 hit that year with "Silence on the Line".

Cargill was one of the earliest guests on Bill Aken's radio show "The Country Call Line" in the mid-1980s, appearing uncompensated to help launch the show. He performed a half-hour segment with his story of 'Buford The Buffalo'. In 1981, Henson gave up touring to found an Oklahoma City nightclub, "Henson's."

Later life and death
In the late 1980s, he retired to Oklahoma City, where he wed Sharon Simms on September 8, 1988.  He died on March 24, 2007, aged 66, during surgery.

Discography

Albums

Singles

References

External links
 Answers
 

1941 births
2007 deaths
Musicians from Oklahoma City
American male singer-songwriters
American country singer-songwriters
Monument Records artists
Atlantic Records artists
Country musicians from Oklahoma
Northwest Classen High School alumni
Colorado State University alumni
20th-century American singers
Singer-songwriters from Oklahoma
20th-century American male singers